Lakarobius is a spider genus of the jumping spider family, Salticidae. Its only species, Lakarobius alboniger, is endemic to Fiji.

Name
Lakarobius signifies living in trees, from Greek lakara, a kind of tree, and bios, life.
The epitheton alboniger means "white-black", because of the spider's black and white dorsal pattern.

References

  (1998): Salticidae of the Pacific Islands. III. Distribution of Seven Genera, with Description of Nineteen New Species and Two New Genera. Journal of Arachnology 26(2): 149-189. PDF
  (2007): The world spider catalog, version 8.0. American Museum of Natural History.

External links
Diagnostic drawings of L. alboniger

Salticidae
Spiders of Fiji
Monotypic Salticidae genera